Events in the year 2017 in Switzerland.

Incumbents
President of the Swiss Confederation: Doris Leuthard
President of the National Council: Jürg Stahl
President of the Swiss Council of States: Ivo Bischofberger

Events

Referendums
Referendums were held on 12 February, 21 May and 24 September 2017.

Sport
2016–17 Swiss Handball League
2017 Geneva Open
2017 Stan Wawrinka tennis season
2017 World Mixed Curling Championship
2017 Yellow Cup
2016–17 Championnat LNA season
2016–17 Championnat LNA season
2017–18 Swiss Basketball League
The Best FIFA Football Awards 2016
2017 European Curling Championships
2017 European Masters (curling)
FIS Alpine World Ski Championships 2017
2017 Katusha–Alpecin season
2017 Ladies Championship Gstaad
2017 Ladies Open Biel Bienne
2017 FIBA 3x3 World Tour – Lausanne Masters
2017 Montreux Volley Masters
2017 Montreux Volley Masters squads
2017 Swiss Indoors
2017 Swiss Open Grand Prix Gold
2017 Swiss Open Gstaad
Switzerland at the 2017 World Aquatics Championships
Switzerland at the 2017 World Games
2017 Tour de Romandie
2016–17 Tour de Ski
2017–18 Tour de Ski
2017 Tour de Suisse
Switzerland at the 2017 World Championships in Athletics

Pop Culture
Switzerland in the Eurovision Song Contest 2017

Deaths

1 January – Karl Gerstner, typographer (b. 1930).
8 January – Dominique Appia, painter (b. 1926).
13 January – Gilberto Agustoni, prelate (b. 1922).
17 January – Daniel Vischer, politician (b. 1950).
18 January – Samuel Widmer,  physician, psychiatrist and psychotherapist (b. 1948).
30 April – Ueli Steck, rock climber (b. 1976)

References

 
2010s in Switzerland
Years of the 21st century in Switzerland